The Men's scratch at the 2011 UCI Track Cycling World Championships was held on March 23. 21 athletes participated in the scratch race. The competition consisted of 60 laps, making a total of 15 km.

Results
The race was held at 20:55.

References

2011 UCI Track Cycling World Championships
UCI Track Cycling World Championships – Men's scratch